In-Quest is a Belgian technical death metal band. Formerly signed with Good Life Recordings, the band were active since the early 1990s, with Sven de Caluwe of Aborted as a singer from 2002 to 2004. He was replaced by Swedish singer Mike Löfberg from Blockhead. They released five albums and two EPs, with their final album called 8: The Odyssey Of Eternity released on August 8, 2013. On February 12, 2014 the band split up.

In-Quest have played at a number of festivals in Belgium and the Netherlands, such as Frostrock, Euroblast, Xmass Festival, Flanders Fields of Death, Arnhem Metal Meeting, and (alongside bands like Slipknot, Fear Factory, Nile, Motörhead, Saxon, and Ensiferum) Graspop Metal Meeting in 2005 (Metal Dome), 2006 (Marquee 1) and 2009 (at Mainstage). Also in 2006, In-Quest opened for Fear Factory, on their "Fifteen Years of Fear" tour. They also supported Nile in 2005 on their EU tour.

Members

Final line-up
 Mike "MiQe" Löfberg - vocals (2004-2014)
 Gert Monden - drums (1994-2014)
 Douglas Verhoeven - lead guitar (1999-2014)
 Korneel "Korre" Lauwereins (bass 2007-2010) - rhythm guitar (2010-2014)

Former members

Vocals
NG "Noise Grinder" Ben Adams - vocals (1994–2002)
Dimitri Janssens - vocals (2002)
Sven de Caluwé - vocals (2002–2004)

Guitars
Wim Roelants - guitar (1994-1999)
Jan Geenen - bass/rhythm guitar (1992-2006)
Ian van Gemeren - rhythm guitar (session) (2006)
Valéry Bottin - rhythm guitar (2006-2010)

Bass
Manu van Tichelen - bass (1997-2005)
Joël Decoster - bass (2005-2007)
Jan Geenen - bass (1994-1997), guitar (1997-2006)
Frederick Peeters - bass (2010-2013)

Timeline

"System Shit" line-up (1988–1994)
Originally formed as Color Of Noise (1987) as a one-man-noise band,
Laurent (Vocals, guitar, drums)

Final "System Shit" line-up (1994) 
NG "Noise Grinder" Ben Adams - vocals (1992-1994)
Gert Monden - drums, backing vocals (1992–1994)
Laurent Swaan - guitar (1988-1994), vocals (1988-1991)
Jan Geenen - bass (1992-1994), drums (1991-1992)

Former "System Shit" members
Peter Smeekens - Bass (1990 - 1991)
Koen Smits - Bass (1991 - August 1993)
Mark Nelissen - Drums (1990 - 1991)
Peter Cornelissen - Guitars (1990)

Discography

Studio albums
Extrusion: Battlehymns (Teutonic Existence, 1997)
Operation: Citadel (Shiver Records, 1999)
Epileptic (Good Life Recordings, 2004)
The Comatose Quandaries (Dockyard1, Good Life Recordings, 2005)
Made Out Of Negative Matter (Self-released, 2009)
CHRONiQLE (The best of...compilation) (Self-released, 2012)
Chapter IIX - The Odyssey of Eternity (Self-released, 2013)

Extended plays
Destination: Pyroclasm (Soulreaper Records, 2003)
The Liquidation Files (Vinyl EP, Self-released, 2010)

Demos
Xylad Valox (1995)

7inch vinyl
Rewarded with Ingratitude (1995)

References

External links 
 Official Website
 In-Quest's Myspace Site
 In-Quest's Youtube Site
 In-Quest  on Purevolume
 Official forum

Belgian death metal musical groups
Musical groups established in 1994
Technical death metal musical groups
Musical quintets
Belgian heavy metal musical groups
1994 establishments in Belgium
Good Life Recordings artists